= Mamuka village =

Mamuka village is a village from the Middle Ages, on the left side of the river Mtkvari.

Located in the area of the current aviation factory in the east of Tbilisi (in the Samgori rayon). In the sources first mentioned in 1721.
